The 2018 Melbourne Cup (known commercially as 2018 Lexus Melbourne Cup) was the 158th running of the Melbourne Cup, a prestigious Australian Thoroughbred horse race.

Lexus commenced a five-year naming rights sponsorship deal, taking over from Emirates. It was the last Melbourne Cup broadcast by the Seven Network before Network Ten takes over in 2019.

The race was won by Cross Counter, ridden by Kerrin McEvoy and trained by Charlie Appleby.

Field

Fatalities
Irish colt The CliffsofMoher was euthanised after he suffered a fractured right shoulder.

Horse naming
Some European horses are forced to be renamed if  horses with the same name are raced in Australia. Sound Check renamed at Sound, Cliffs of Moher renamed The CliffsofMoher and Prince of Arran were renamed to A Prince of Arran (raced at Prince of Arran on 2019 and 2020 Melbourne Cup). Sound Check were permitted raced at original name on Melbourne Cup.

Penalties

After the races, 6 jockeys were fined.

Hugh Bowman was cited on three separate charges in the $7.3 million race - an incident of careless riding at the 500m, excessive whip use prior to the final 100m and the fact that he weighed in more than half a kilogram over his prescribed weight of 55 kg aboard runner-up Marmelo.

Kerrin McEvoy was fined $3000 after using the whip nine times - four more than what is permitted under the rules - on Cross Counter in the final 400m of the race.

Jim Crowley and Christine Puls were also suspended for careless riding on the undercard at Flemington.

References

2018
Melbourne Cup
2010s in Melbourne
Melbourne Cup